Malaterre is a surname. Notable people with the surname include:

 Jacques Malaterre, French film director
 Sadaf Malaterre (born 1969), Pakistani fashion designer
 Sixtine Malaterre (born 1987), French canoeist